Lance Mungia (born 1972) is an American screenwriter and film director of the film Six String Samurai and co-writer/director of The Crow: Wicked Prayer for Dimension Films.

Mungia also wrote and directed the short film Garden for Rio, produced at Loyola Marymount University, where he attended as a film student.

References

External links

American film directors
Living people
1972 births